Borussia  is the Latin name for Prussia.

Football clubs 
 Borussia Dortmund
 Borussia Fulda
 Borussia Mönchengladbach
 Borussia Neunkirchen
 HSV Borussia Friedenstal
 SC Borussia Lindenthal-Hohenlind
 Tennis Borussia Berlin
 Wuppertaler SV Borussia
 Borussia ECE Rennes
 BFC Preussen
 SC Preußen Münster
 SV Viktoria Preußen 07
 Preußen Danzig

Other uses 
 Borussia-Park, the stadium of Borussia Mönchengladbach 
 , a number of steamships including:
 Borussia (built 1855), Germany's first screw-propelled ship
 Corps Borussia Bonn, student corps
 Corps Saxo-Borussia Heidelberg, Heidelberger student corps